The 2019 Football Championship of Donetsk Oblast was won by Sapfir Kramatorsk.

League table

References

Football
Donetsk
Donetsk